Mute is a novel by Piers Anthony published in 1981.

Plot summary
Mute is a novel in which the mutant named Knot and the galactic agent named Finesse combat the Lobos who want to take over the Galactic Co-ordination Computer.

Reception
Dave Langford reviewed Mute for White Dwarf #55, and stated that "Parts are exciting; parts are risible; Anthony's tortuously fair conclusion may surprise trad space-opera fans. His heart's in the right place, but he isn't half verbose and didactic. Better, anyway, than his fantasies."

Reviews
Review by Peter T. Garratt (1988) in Interzone, #23 Spring 1988

References

1981 novels
Avon (publisher) books